Trade Bank of Iraq (TBI) was established in July 2003 to facilitate Iraq's domestic and international trade dealings once the United Nations Oil-for-Food Programme ended in 2003.

History 
TBI was established by the Coalition Provisional Authority on 17 July 2003 as an independent government entity to provide financial services to facilitate import and export of goods and services to and from Iraq. TBI was licensed by the Central Bank of Iraq and commenced its operations one month after the decision to establish it as a government financial institution had been taken. Since then, TBI has grown into a leading bank in Iraq through strengthening its financial position, assets, and equity. TBI started with paid-up capital of USD 5 million (authorised capital: USD 100 million) in July 2003 and the paid-up capital increased to IQD 1.75 trillion (USD 1.5 billion) as at the close of 2015 by capitalisation of retained earnings. TBI recorded an annual profit of USD 454 million during 2016. The bank quickly developed into an organization with an asset base of USD 19.7 billion as at the close of 2016.

In the first year of operation TBI was associated with a consortium of international banks led by JPMorgan Chase. During the startup period, the consortium offered TBI technical support and banking know-how and it has been issuing and confirming letters of credit and letters of guarantee on behalf of TBI. The consortium remained at the heart of TBI's correspondent network and had been a key element in the successful growth of TBI's trade business.

In a short period, TBI built relationships with an international network of 134 correspondent banks covering 63 cities spread over 39 countries.

TBI's initial customer base consisted of ministries and government-run public sector corporations. During its first year of operation, TBI opened letters of credit only for the public sector clients. During 2005, the bank's customer base widened to include private sector companies and clients. TBI also started granting credit facilities and loans to the private sector in 2005.

Products and services 
Financial products include saving accounts, current accounts, Priority Banking (Jumar), term deposits, certificate of deposits (tistahel), payroll accounts, Automated Clearing House (ACH), real-time gross settlement (RTGS), debit cards, credit cards, Automated Teller Machine (ATM), Point of Sale (POS), E-commerce, Cash Management, Foreign Exchange, trade services, Trade Finance, Personal loans, Car Loans, Term Finance, Working Capital Finance and Project Finance. TBI also finances salaried employees, getting their salaries through their accounts in TBI for purchasing vehicle, house and to meet their personal requirements.

Offices

Domestic offices 
TBI has 25 domestic offices spread over Baghdad, Basra, Erbil, Sulaimaniyah, Najaf, Karbala, Hilla, Kut, Nasiriyah, Amarah, Ramadi and Tikrit governorates. The bank is expanding its network of branches to cover all governorates of Iraq.

Foreign offices 
TBI opened a Representative Office at Abu Dhabi Global Market in UAE on 26 November 2017. It is the bank’s first office outside of Iraq.

TBI also opened a branch in Riyadh, Saudi Arabia in April 2019.

See also
 List of banks in Iraq
 Iraqi dinar
 Central Bank of Iraq

References

Companies based in Baghdad
Banks of Iraq
Banks established in 2003
Iraqi companies established in 2003